The Bulls–Pistons rivalry is an NBA rivalry between the Chicago Bulls and Detroit Pistons. The rivalry began in the late 1980s and was one of the most intense in NBA history for a couple of years, when Michael Jordan evolved into one of the league's best players and the Pistons became a playoff contender.  They represent the two largest metro areas in the Midwest and are only separated by a 280-mile stretch of road, mostly covered by I-94. The ferocity of the rivalry can also be attributed to the geographic Chicago-Detroit rivalry, which is mirrored in the Major League Baseball's White Sox–Tigers rivalry, the National Football League's Bears–Lions rivalry and the National Hockey League's Blackhawks–Red Wings rivalry.

History

1988–90: The Bad Boys & Jordan Rules
The two teams met in the playoffs for the first time in the 1974 Western Conference Semifinals which the Bulls won in seven games. But the rivalry really started in the 1988 Eastern Conference Semifinals after the Pistons and Bulls beat the Bullets and Cavs in the first round 3–2. The aggressive Bad Boys, as Detroit became known, were the rising power in the Eastern Conference. Michael Jordan, on the other hand, was league MVP, Defensive Player of the Year, and the ultimate challenge for the Pistons' top-notch defense. In a nationally televised game in Detroit on Easter Sunday, Jordan scored 59 points in a 112–110 Bulls victory. Previously, in 1987, he had scored 61 points in a 125–120 OT victory. This angered Chuck Daly, who vowed never to allow Jordan to light them up again. Despite Jordan's individual skills, the Bulls lacked the talent and mental toughness to beat Detroit, who defeated Chicago in 5 games. The Pistons went on to beat Boston in 6 and won their first Conference title since they moved from Fort Wayne.
In 1989, the Pistons were stronger and posted a season-best record of 63–19. They reached the Conference Finals by sweeping the Celtics and Bucks. The 6th-seeded Bulls (47–35) had surprising success in the playoffs by upsetting the Cavs 3–2 with The Shot and Knicks 4–2. The Bulls met Detroit in the Eastern Conference Finals. Bulls success continued as they took a 2–1 series lead. But the Pistons clamped down and employed the "Jordan Rules" (which consisted of solely targeting Jordan) which worked so well for them the year prior. While they remained silent about them when asked by the media, many Pistons today say that it was just another psychological ploy they made up to throw the Bulls off their game. According to Pistons forward Rick Mahorn,

The Pistons won 3 straight games and went on to win their first NBA title.

While both teams intensely disliked each other, there was particular animosity between Michael Jordan and Pistons star Isiah Thomas. Thomas, who was a Chicago native and basketball legend in the city, is accused of feeling that Jordan was taking the city away from him and getting unearned attention. Thomas was accused of leading a so-called "freeze-out" in the 1985 NBA All-Star Game that involved Thomas and other NBA veterans keeping the ball away from Jordan. In retaliation, when the 1992 United States men's Olympic basketball team was being formed Isiah was not part of the team, which people attribute to Jordan and Scottie Pippen stating that they did not want to play if Thomas was on the team, with Pippen going as far to label him as a "cheap shot artist".

For the 1989–90 season under new coach Phil Jackson, the Bulls sought to subvert the "Jordan Rules" by focusing on the triangle offense refined by assistant coach Tex Winter. By sharing responsibility rather than shouldering it, Jordan led Chicago to the second-best record in the East at 55–27 behind the defending champion Pistons, who finished 59–23. The rematch was set up when Detroit swept Indiana in the opening round, then ousted New York in 5. The Bulls beat the Bucks in 4 and 76ers in 5. In an Eastern Conference Finals rematch, Chicago pushed Detroit to the limit. But the Pistons showed their dominance and won Game 7 at home. The Pistons went on to win their 2nd straight NBA title against the Blazers.

1991: The Bulls finally break through
For the 1990–91 season Bulls posted the best record in the East at 61–21, while the Pistons would drop to third with a record of 50–32. The Bulls reached the Conference Finals by sweeping the Knicks and beating the 76ers in 5, while the Pistons disposed of Atlanta in 5 and beat Boston in 6. Both teams met in the Conference Finals for the third straight year, with Chicago holding home-court advantage for the first time. Chicago swept Detroit. Isiah Thomas, Bill Laimbeer and Mark Aguirre, in their last show of defiance, walked off the court with 7.9 seconds left so as not to congratulate them. Only Joe Dumars and John Salley shook hands with any of the Bulls. In the NBA Finals, the Bulls defeated Magic Johnson's Lakers to win their 1st NBA title.

Dormancy
The Pistons and Bulls would never again meet in the playoffs during the Bulls dynasty, although they came close in both 1992 and 1997. Following the 1991 sweep, James Edwards and Vinnie Johnson would leave the Pistons as free agents, and the team would see a steady decline. Chuck Daly would resign as head coach after the 1991–92 season. Following Daly's departure, the Pistons went through a lengthy transitional period, as key players either retired (Laimbeer in 1993 and Thomas in 1994) or got traded (John Salley, Dennis Rodman among others). They would bottom out in the 1993–94 season, finishing only 20–62.
With the arrival of Grant Hill (drafted 3rd overall in 1994), the Pistons once again became a playoff team in the latter half of the 1990s. Despite seeing some success during that period, they never became true title contenders.

Meanwhile, the Bulls proceeded to win 6 titles in 8 years, including two three-peats, with an early retirement and return of Michael Jordan in between. Former Piston Dennis Rodman, would be traded to the Bulls in 1995 and play an integral part in the second three-peat and during that second three-peat Dennis Rodman would not interact with Jordan or Pippen outside of games(John Salley and James Edwards were also on the team during the record-breaking 72-win 1995–96 season). After the 6th title, the Bulls were dramatically dismantled: Jordan, Scottie Pippen, Rodman, and coach Phil Jackson all left. Afterwards, the Bulls had five losing seasons and did not yield a competitive squad until former Bull John Paxson (who was a member of the first 3 title teams) became the GM and acquired players to form a team with efficient perimeter offense and strong interior defense.

After being swept by the Miami Heat in the 2000 playoffs, Joe Dumars was hired as President of Basketball Operations of Pistons. Dumars eventually revamped the Pistons' roster with players like Ben Wallace, Chucky Atkins, Chauncey Billups, Richard "Rip" Hamilton,  Tayshaun Prince. and Rasheed Wallace. They were constant playoff contenders with Six consecutive Eastern Conference Finals appearances between 2003 and 2008. They defeated the Los Angeles Lakers in five games for the team's third NBA championship in 2004 NBA Finals.

The rivalry returns
The rivalry was restored in the 2006 offseason when the Bulls signed free agent Ben Wallace, the cornerstone of the Pistons' defense. The addition of Wallace was immediately felt when the Bulls won the first regular season game in a blowout against the defending champion Miami Heat, the team that defeated the Pistons in the 2006 Eastern Conference Finals.
The move of Ben Wallace stymied the Pistons early in the season, as the team sought to look for consistency without him. Dumars took the initiative and signed Chris Webber, who was just released from the 76ers. The teams met in the Eastern Conference Semifinals after the Pistons swept the Magic and the Bulls swept the Heat. The Pistons dominated the early parts of the series, stifling the Bulls' guards to sub-40% shooting to win not only the first two games at home, but also the first game in Chicago, in which the Pistons came back from a 17-point deficit in the second half. The Bulls shut down the Pistons' offense in the next two games to win Games 4 and 5. However, the Pistons won Game 6 in Chicago, winning the series 4–2.

Another dormant period
The Pistons made it back to the Conference Finals in 2008. Chauncey Billups was traded early in the 2009 season, and they steadily declined. The Cleveland Cavaliers swept them in 2009. The Pistons signed free-agents Ben Gordon and Charlie Villanueva, and welcomed back Ben Wallace that offseason. However, injuries demoted them from an Eastern Conference power, winning only 27 games in the 2010 season, thus a rebuilding period for the team began. The team did manage to make it to the playoffs once again in 2016, once again losing to the Cleveland Cavaliers in a four-game sweep.

After missing the playoffs in a dismal 2008, the Bulls earned the first pick in the 2008 NBA Draft. They selected Chicago native Derrick Rose. The Bulls steadily rose to one of the NBA's elite teams; after a pair of 41-win seasons in Rose's first two seasons, the Bulls signed free-agent forward Carlos Boozer, and with the development of Joakim Noah to one of the best centers in the league, the Bulls rose the ranks in the Eastern Conference. However, subsequent injuries to Rose demoted them from being an elite team, and the team would struggle with inconsistency for several years. After trading Rose in 2016 and star forward Jimmy Butler in 2017, another rebuilding period began for the Bulls. Later on Jordan would reflect on the Bulls Pistons rivalry and he still does not like the Bad boys pistons team.

See also

 Bears–Lions rivalry
 Blackhawks–Red Wings rivalry
 George Jewett Trophy

Notes
 During the 2007 NBA All-Star Weekend, the two teams competed against each other in the Shooting Stars Competition. Chicago (Ben Gordon, Candice Dupree, Scottie Pippen) and Detroit (Chauncey Billups, Swin Cash, Bill Laimbeer) both qualified to reach the Finals. The Bulls were disqualified when Gordon shot out of order before Dupree, allowing Detroit to win by default. Billups, Cash, and Laimbeer celebrated by shouting out Mason's famous chant of, "Deeeeee-troit Basket-ball!" Mason was at the Thomas and Mack Center to announce during the games and events at the 2007 NBA All-Star Weekend.

Common players 
The following players have played for both the Bulls and the Pistons in their careers:
 Orlando Woolridge – Bulls (–), Pistons (–)
 Brad Sellers – Bulls (–), Pistons
 John Salley – Pistons (–), Bulls
 Dennis Rodman – Pistons (–), Bulls (–)
 James Edwards - Pistons (–), Bulls
 Bison Dele – Bulls, Pistons (–)
 Ben Wallace - Pistons (–, –), Bulls (–)
 Lindsey Hunter - Pistons (–, –), Bulls (–)
 Ben Gordon - Bulls (–), Pistons (–)
 Derrick Rose - Bulls (–), Pistons (–)
 Richard Hamilton – Pistons (–), Bulls (–)
 Tyler Cook – Pistons (2021), Bulls (2022)
 Andre Drummond – Pistons (–), Bulls (–present)

References

National Basketball Association rivalries
Chicago Bulls
Detroit Pistons
Sports in the Midwestern United States